The 1924 United States Senate election in Michigan was held on November 4, 1924. Incumbent Republican U.S. Senator James J. Couzens, who was appointed following the resignation of Truman Newberry, was re-elected to a full term in a landslide.

General election

Candidates
Mortimer Elwyn Cooley, professor at University of Michigan and former president of the American Society of Mechanical Engineers (Democratic)
James J. Couzens, incumbent U.S. Senator since 1922 and former Mayor of Detroit (Republican)
Logan M. Cunningham (Socialist Labor)
Albert L. Day (Socialist)
Frank E. Titus (Prohibition)

Results

See also 
 1924 United States Senate elections

References 

1924
Michigan
United States Senate